Subhash Chandra Goenka (born 30 November 1950) is an Indian billionaire media baron. He is the chairman of the Essel Group, an Indian media conglomerate and founded Zee TV in 1992. He was also the chairman of Zee Media but resigned as Director and Non-Executive Chairman of the company on 24 May 2016. He was elected to the Upper House of the Indian parliament for the Haryana state in the 2016 Rajya Sabha election, as an independent candidate supported by legislators from the Bharatiya Janata Party.

On 31 May 2022 Subhash Chandra filed his nomination from Rajasthan for elections to the Rajya Sabha as an Independent candidate backed by the Bharatiya Janata Party, but he lost the election.

Early years
Subhash Chandra is born in an Agarwal Bania family in Adampur, Hisar district, Haryana. Forbes India notes that Chandra was born in Rajasthan, and moved with his family to Hisar during his childhood. His family could not afford his higher education, and in 1965 he dropped out of school to join the family business of commission agents and traders who procured and supplied rice to the Food Corporation of India.

In the 1980s, he started manufacturing flexible packaging (mainly plastic tubes) for fast moving consumer goods such as toothpaste under the brand name Essel Packaging. He followed it up with a leisure park Essel World in north Mumbai.

In 1992, he launched Zee TV, the second private commercial television channel in the country in association with Star TV in Hong Kong, and in 2003, Dish TV, the first satellite television provider in India.

Business 
Chandra launched India's first satellite TV channel, Zee TV, in 1992. The channel competes with, among others, Sony Entertainment Television and STAR Plus. Currently, the Zee TV network, consists of up to 90 channels, reaching 1.3 billion people spread over 174 countries.

In 2005, in collaboration with Dainik Bhaskar group, Chandra launched an English-language daily newspaper, DNA, in Mumbai to challenge the well-settled The Times of India. The competition was one of the biggest newspaper battles of Mumbai. Sustaining earlier losses, the newspaper eventually turned around. However, by October 2019, DNA was defunct and completely shut down.

On 25 November 2019, Chandra had to resign as chairman of his company Zee Entertainment Enterprises, as per the SEBI Listing Regulations. However, he still continues as a non-executive director of the company.

In his autobiography ‘The Z factor: My journey as the wrong man at the right time’, Chandra has written about his association with the Rashtriya Swayamsevak Sangh, ideological parent of the BJP, in his younger days. Chandra claimed the support of Bharatiya Janata Party (BJP) legislators and said he had others across party lines.

On 22 May 2020, Essel Group defaulted ₹616 Crore secured NCD Bonds with standstill agreement along with Subhash Chandra Personal Guarantee thus affecting 3,00,000 investors.

In August 2020, Zee Entertainment Enterprises Ltd (ZEEL) appointed promoter Subhash Chandra as chairman emeritus, following his resignation as non-executive director of the firm. Subhash Chandra, who was previously chairman, would now continue to be associated with the business in an honorary fashion.

Awards
 International Emmy Directorate Award (2011)
 Canada India Foundation, Chanchlani Global Indian Award

References

External links

Subhash Chandra Foundation

Indian mass media owners
Indian billionaires
Living people
1950 births
Marwari people
Essel Group
Zee Entertainment Enterprises
People from Hisar district
Indian television executives
Indian television company founders
International Emmy Directorate Award
Businesspeople from Bihar
Rajya Sabha members from Haryana
Independent politicians in India